Babarenda South I is a small town in Sri Lanka. It is located within Southern Province , which is one of the smallest of the nine provinces but one of the most populated.

See also
List of towns in Southern Province, Sri Lanka

External links

Populated places in Southern Province, Sri Lanka